Bruce Keith Baker (born April 25, 1956, in Ottawa, Ontario) is a Canadian former professional ice hockey right winger.

Career 
Baker was drafted in the first round, 18th overall, by the Montreal Canadiens in the 1976 NHL Amateur Draft. He was also drafted by the Calgary Cowboys of the World Hockey Association. He never played in the National Hockey League or the WHA, however. He spent his entire five-year professional career in the American Hockey League with the Nova Scotia Voyageurs.

Personal life 
He lives in Kanata, Ontario with his wife, Kellie.

External links

1976 NHL Amateur Draft - Bruce Baker

References 

1956 births
Calgary Cowboys draft picks
Canadian ice hockey right wingers
Ice hockey people from Ottawa
Living people
Montreal Canadiens draft picks
National Hockey League first-round draft picks
Nova Scotia Voyageurs players
Ottawa 67's players